Frank Donald Smith (June 1, 1894 – June 11, 1964) was a Canadian ice hockey administrator.  He is recognized for contributing to the organization of the Beaches Hockey League, which eventually became the Greater Toronto Hockey League, the largest minor league hockey organization in the world. He was elected to the Hockey Hall of Fame in 1962 in the "Builder" category.

Smith was born in Chatham, Ontario.

References

External links 
 

1894 births
1964 deaths
Hockey Hall of Fame inductees
Ice hockey people from Ontario